Killed Until Dead is an adventure game developed by Artech and published by Accolade in 1986. It was released on Apple II, Amstrad CPC, Commodore 64, and ZX Spectrum.

Gameplay
The game itself seems to be inspired by Cluedo, where the player must eliminate clues as they get closer to stopping the crime, the objective being to stop a murder before it happens. Gameplay revolves primarily around interrogating key suspects and interviewing them about other people, places, and objects. False accusations can lead to the player getting killed, lending to the game's humorous ironic sentiments.

Plot
Five mystery writers have gathered at a mansion and one of them plans to murder another. The player takes the role of Hercule Holmes, who must piece together all aspects of the crime in order to solve the case. The player can search suspect's rooms, confront them with evidence, and order cameras to record secret meetings.

Reception

The game was well-received, garnering positive to moderate reviews.

Crash magazine deemed Killed Until Dead both involved and highly entertaining. Aktueller Software Markt gave the game a score of 9.6 out of 12, while Happy Computer offered a rating of 76%.

Computer and Video Games praised the humorous cartoon animations and frequent sound effects. Comparing Killed Until Dead to Clue, Compute!'s Gazette liked the game's user interface, note system, and humor, concluding that it "fits in very well with Accolade's impressive line of 64 software". Roy Wagner reviewed the game for Computer Gaming World, and stated that "The game is great family or group entertainment. The graphics and animation are tremendous; the presentation is very much like a movie; and the humor in the game is outstandingly funny. All puns are very much intended."

References

External links

1986 video games
Accolade (company) games
Adventure games
Amstrad CPC games
Apple II games
Commodore 64 games
Puzzle video games
U.S. Gold games
Video games developed in Canada
ZX Spectrum games
Single-player video games
Artech Studios games